Subatomic Sound System, founded in 1999 by Emch and Noah Shachtman, is an American record label and collective hosting musicians, producers, DJs, and visual artists from a variety of backgrounds and traditions.  In late 2008, Subatomic Sound System garnered international attention for a limited edition vinyl 12" featuring their collaboration with Vienna's Dubblestandart and dub inventor Lee "Scratch" Perry, releasing the first songs from Perry in the dubstep genre, one of the first recorded examples of a tangible connection between the popular UK based electronic genre that emerged in the begin of the first decade of the 21st century and the Jamaican dub from the 1970s where dubstep's origins were rooted and which had been primarily originated by Perry himself.  Beginning in 2008, Subatomic Sound System started hosting weekly radio shows on 91.5fm, Radio New York, and webcasts on Brooklyn Radio. In 2011 Subatomic Sound System began performing as Lee "Scratch" Perry's backing band with a hybrid of electronics and live instruments. In 2013 they performed together at Coachella Valley Music and Arts Festival and afterward became Perry's exclusive touring band in North America. In 2017, Subatomic Sound System released their first full-length album with Perry entitled 'Super Ape Returns To Conquer' which debuted No. 5 on the Billboard reggae chart and No. 2 on iTunes US reggae album chart and reached No. 1 on North America World music NACC charts.

Performance history
Fall 2001: Subatomic Sound System won the Red Bull Vinyl Lab competition in New York City using an early incarnation of Native Instruments Traktor DJ software on a laptop at a time when laptops were not commonly used in musical performance.  When judges discovered software had been used to create the mix CD, it sparked controversy amongst the judges. In the end, judges conceded that there was no valid grounds for disqualifying Subatomic Sound System for using DJ software rather than traditional vinyl and turntables, so they upheld their victory in the competition.

From 2007 to the present: Subatomic Sound System increased touring throughout North America and Europe in a variety of configurations from live band of ten, to electronic trio, to DJs as styles like dubstep increased in popularity and the interest in new dub oriented music emanating from New York City increased (largely the result of successful releases from NYC artists such as Dr. Israel, Ticklah, Easy Star All-Stars, Dub Gabriel, Bill Laswell, Matisyahu, and others).

July 19, 2009: Subatomic Sound System performed to a beyond capacity crowd at Summerstage in Central Park, New York City, along with Lee "Scratch" Perry & Dubblestandart (with a cameo from Ari Up) as well as Alpha Blondy. The lineup for this event drew the largest Summerstage crowd of the season, confirming organizers' expectations. Given the multicultural and cross generational audiences who turn out in Central Park, organizers had hoped this billing would draw on the connection between modern incarnations of dub based music such as dubstep and the dub and roots reggae styles from over 30 years before, originated by Perry in Jamaica that influenced artists like Blondy to extend that sound in Africa. Those styles then influenced groups like Dubblestandart and Subatomic Sound System in Europe and the US to meld that sound with other contemporary electronic based genres.

2012: Lee Scratch Perry with Subatomic Sound System as his band and opening act, go on tour across the US, May 16 through May 26.  In September they perform together again at Dub Champions Festival in New York City, Music Hall of Williamsburg.

2013: Lee Scratch Perry and Subatomic Sound System tour the west coast and southwest USA including two shows at the Coachella arts & music festival, April 12 & 19, performing music ranging from the roots reggae off Perry's Super Ape album to dubstep and bass music riddims by Subatomic Sound System.

Radio shows
Beginning in 2008, Subatomic Sound System started Subatomic Sound Radio, hosting weekly radio shows on 91.5FM, Radio New York and Brooklyn Radio webcasts. The Radio New York show is part of a nightly program called Mo'Glo sponsored by Seattle-based public radio station KEXP.

Release history

"Black Ark Vampires" Lee "Scratch" Perry & Subatomic Sound System 
The song "Black Ark Vampires" was premiered on Halloween October 31, 2014, via the Brooklyn-based Jamaican culture website Large Up, with an explanation of Perry's lyrics about killing vampires and why Lee Scratch Perry burned down his Black Ark Studios in Jamaica decades before.  In the song, Perry describes killing vampires with fire, electric wire, roast corn, and his own hair in locations around the globe including America, England, and Kingston, Jamaica. Live concerts by Lee "Scratch" Perry & Subatomic Sound System from 2001-2014 combined digital electronics and live instrumentalists and singers and this recorded song can also be heard to use a similar blend of elements specifically instrumentation like electric guitar, bass, percussion, and harmonized background vocal produced with space echo and spring reverb effects in a fashion typical of reggae recordings from Perry's Black Ark Studios during the 1970s as well as using electronic synthesized sub-bass and digital drums common to 21st century electronic music genres like dubstep and trap music.  The song was released on vinyl 45rpm exclusively on November 4, 2014 and appeared at No. 1 on Juno Records charts in both dub and reggae. Reggae dancehall vocalist Jahdan Blakkamoore appeared as a supporting vocalist on the track, a collaborator on several other Perry & Subatomic Sound releases as well as vocalist and primary writer on Snoop Lion and Major Lazer albums.  Blakkamoore is mostly known for his numerous releases  both solo and with his band Noble Society whose release "Living the Life" came out on the Subatomic Sound label.

Iron Devil: Lee "Scratch" Perry's first dubstep track
In fall of 2008, Subatomic Sound System produced a collaborative remix in a dubstep style with Vienna's Dubblestandart & dub originator Lee "Scratch" Perry who were working jointly on completing an album entitled Return From Planet Dub which included new versions of several of Perry's most famous tunes and riddims from his hey day in Jamaica during the 1970s. The Subatomic Sound System remix was Perry's first release in the dubstep style that by late 2008 had spread from the UK and was beginning to see worldwide popularity among electronic music fans and an ever-growing crowd of curious music listeners. The remix was titled "Iron Devil" and was based on the riddim used for some of Lee's biggest hits like "Disco Devil", "Chase The Devil" with Max Romeo, and "Croaking Lizard" from Lee's seminal Super Ape album. A short run of those records was pressed as advance promotion for the forthcoming album and included some exclusive vinyl only mixes, namely dubstep and 1980s dancehall reggae style mixes of "Iron Devil" on the A side and two remixes of Dubblestandart tracks by Tom Watson, a producer from Paris, France, on the B side, one of which was "Wadada" (originally recorded by Dub Syndicate) the first ever dubstep track featuring the Jamaican voice of thunder, Prince Far-I .

The limited edition vinyl 12" was distributed in either a blank white jacket or, for about 150 copies, in a vintage red, gold and green comic art jacket that was acquired from Tuff Gong in Jamaica and bore the Solographic Productions imprint (leading some stores to incorrectly list Solographic as the label for the release). The record itself had a blank white label marked on only on the A-side by a devil head hand stamped on it with red ink. It sold out in less than a week and it quickly became highly sought after on secondary vinyl markets and vinyl collectors' sites such as Discogs.

The release has historical significance for several reasons. Firstly, at the age of 73, Perry was suddenly finding new audiences for his music worldwide through the evolution of dub into dubstep. Secondly, its popularity was indicative of a cultural diaspora and evolution of a non-commercial subgenre of music developed in Jamaica largely by Perry into a movement that had rippled around the world through various music genres to later create a subgenre of electronic music called dubstep over 30 years later in the UK that reunited its offspring with their forefather and propelled them both to broader prominence that in the process crossed cultural, generational and racial boundaries.

Blackboard Jungle dubstep
In July 2009, another 12" was released that featured dubstep tracks based on "Blackboard Jungle", the title track of The Upsetters' album Blackboard Jungle Dub produced by Perry and considered by some to be the first ever dub album. The original Blackboard Jungle Dub album from the 1970s was mastered and re-released as Upsetters 14 Dub Blackboard Jungle and the tune "Blackboard Jungle" was renamed "Black Panta". Dubblestandart remade the tune in collaboration with Perryon their album Return From Planet Dub in spring 2009. That release also had remixes of the song by Subatomic Sound System. For the dubstep vinyl release that followed, Subatomic Sound System developed new versions of "Blackboard Jungle" based on that remix and involving Guyana-born/NYC-based dancehall reggae vocalist Jahdan Blakkamoore for vocals along with Perry. The vinyl release 12" catalog number was SS009 and was followed up in 2010 by digital releases SS010 and SS011 that featured alternative versions. A mini-documentary featuring Perry covering the making of the "Iron Devil" and "Blackboard Jungle" dubstep remixes with Dubblestandart and Subatomic Sound System, their capacity crowd performance in Central Park, and the evolution of dub to dubstep, was created and released on the internet via sites like YouTube.

Electronic Cumbia Dub
In late 2011, the Subatomic Sound label released a project called Sancocho e Tigres, a collective of young producers from across South and Central America who are electronic music producers as well as players of instruments.  The project was organized by Caballo (Rebel Records) from Colombia.  Subatomic Sound put out two releases, one of a single, "Lujo De Pobre", that included a song as well as the self-produced samples by the collective members used to create the song. A second release followed with various versions of the song that each member put together from those same samples. Later that year Subatomic Sound System had Colombian producer Bleepolar (of Sanchocho e Tigres) remix "Dem Can't Stop We From Talk" with Anthony B, one of the first instances of a Jamaican dancehall artist appearing on an official cumbia remix.

On All Frequencies
The first official full-length album by Subatomic Sound System, On All Frequencies covered a broad range of genres, tempos and timbres. On All Frequencies entered the CMJ radio Top 40 charts in both "electronic" and "world" (i.e. reggae) categories simultaneously during spring 2007. The album received positive reactions across a broad spectrum of the electronic, hip hop and reggae press. It was described by BPM magazine in its vital releases column as "connecting the dots between dub, dancehall, hip hop, drum & bass, downtempo and broken beat". It received a four afro rating from the popular website Okayplayer, (their ratings system based on site founder and The Roots drummer Questlove's hairstyle), who opined, "These beats could become the blueprint for future producers...Genius producing", a "certified gunsmoke!" review from OJ Lima, former VIBE magazine editor and founder of DJ culture site, Limachips, and the reggae-centric Beat magazine wrote that the song "'Rize Up' is a virtual revolutionary anthem".  The album was highlighted in Beyond Race magazine's 2007 Music Issue and Subatomic Sound System performed at the magazine release party in Brooklyn, New York. The Subatomic Sound System System song "Breakin' Down the Barriers" inspired the magazine's editor to use the title as the name of the subsequent issue and it became a theme song for the magazine's mission.

Discography

Albums, EPs, digital singles
Revolution 2 Freedom Subatomic Sound System & Junior Dread (2020, Subatomic Sound | SS037 | digital )
Champion Sound Subatomic Sound System & Screechy Dan (2020, Subatomic Sound | SS037 | digital )
Shaolin Dub Subatomic Sound System  (2019, Subatomic Sound | SS036 | digital )
Super Ape Returns To Conquer Lee "Scratch" Perry & Subatomic Sound System  (featuring  Screechy Dan, Jahdan Blakkamoore, & Ari Up) (2017, Subatomic Sound | SS033 | digital, CD, vinyl via Echo Beach )
NYC-2-Africa-2-Brasil (featuring  Anthony B,Jahdan Blakkamoore, Bajah, & Nomadic Wax) remixes by Victor Rice, Maga Bo, Buguinha Dub (2016, Subatomic Sound | SS030A | digital)
NYC-2-Africa (featuring  Anthony B,Jahdan Blakkamoore, Bajah, & Nomadic Wax) (2010, Subatomic Sound | SS016 | digital)
Blackboard Jungle Vol.2 Respect My Shit (featuring  Dubblestandart, Lee Scratch Perry, Jahdan Blakkamoore) (2009, Subatomic Sound | SS011 | digital)
Blackboard Jungle Vol.1 Respect the Foundation (featuring  Dubblestandart, Lee Scratch Perry, Jahdan Blakkamoore) (2009, Subatomic Sound | SS010 | digital)
Heat Brings Heat (featuring Pete Miser) (2008, Subatomic Sound/ Modus Vivendi | SS007 | digital)
Crucial Times (2008, Subatomic Sound/ Modus Vivendi | SS006 | digital)
On All Frequencies (Instrumentals & Mixtape)  (2008, Subatomic Sound/ Modus Vivendi | SS00 | digital)
On All Frequencies (Instrumentals)  (2008, Subatomic Sound/ Modus Vivendi | SS005 | digital)
On All Frequencies (featuring King Django)(2007, Subatomic Sound/ Modus Vivendi / Nomadic Wax | MVM009 | CD, digital)
Lost Hits Vol. 1: Dancehall versus Hip Hop (featuring Pete Miser and King Django) (2005, Subatomic Sound/ | SS004 | digital)

Vinyl
Black Ark Vampires/Dub Lee "Scratch" Perry & Subatomic Sound System  7" 45rpm (2014, Subatomic Sound | cat# SS020)
Dem Can't Stop We From Talk (Dubiterian remix)/NYC-2-Africa riddim (Dubiterian remix) Anthony B, Subatomic Sound System & Nomadic Wax 7" 45rpm (2014, Subatomic Sound | cat# SS028)
Jah is Coming/Dubbing on the Moon Subatomic Sound System & Thomas Blondet 7" 45rpm (2014, Subatomic Sound | cat# SS027)
Dem Can't Stop We From Talk/NYC-2-Africa riddim Anthony B meets Subatomic Sound System & Nomadic Wax 7" 45rpm (2011, Subatomic Sound | cat# SS024)
Dem Can't Stop We From Talk/Kingston Riot riddim Anthony B meets Dubblestandart  7" 45rpm  (2011, Subatomic Sound | cat# SS023)
Vampires & Informers Elephant Man 12" 33rpm (2010, Subatomic Sound | cat# SS018)
Hello, Hello, Hell is Very Low b/w Bed Athletes featuring Lee "Scratch" Perry and Ari Up of The Slits 7" 45rpm (2010, Subatomic Sound | cat#SS014) [#1 on Ernie B reggae vinyl chart]
Chrome Optimism Dubblestandart meets Lee "Scratch" Perry and David Lynch | 12" vinyl, 33rpm (2010, Subatomic Sound | cat# SS012)
Blackboard Jungle featuring Lee "Scratch" Perry, Jahdan Blakkamoore, Dubblestandart 12" 33rpm (2009, Subatomic Sound | cat#SS009)
Iron Devil featuring Lee "Scratch" Perry and Dubblestandart 12" 33rpm (2008, Subatomic Sound | cat#SS008)
Our Father, Our King 7" 45rpm (2008, Bastard Jazz Recordings | cat#BJ7003)

Remixes
Amsterdam Marlon Asher & Leah Rosier (2011, Dubbhism | digital) included remix Amsterdam (Subatomic Sound System Bloodstep mix)
Vampires & Informers Elephant Man (2011, Subatomic Sound | cat# SS019 | digital) included remixes Vampires & Informers (Subatomic Sound System Bloodstep mix), Vampires & Informers (Subatomic Sound System bloodsucker's dub)
Modern Dayz Slavery The Bant Singh Project featuring Delhi Sultanate (2011, Word Sound Power | digital) included remix Modern Dayz Slavery (Subatomic Sound System remix)
Vampires & Informers Elephant Man (2010, Subatomic Sound | cat# SS018 | vinyl) included remixes Vampires & Informers (Subatomic Sound System Bloodstep mix)
Chrome Optimism Dubblestandart meets Lee "Scratch" Perry and David Lynch (2010, Subatomic Sound | cat# SS015 | digital) included remixes Chrome Optimism (Subatomic Sound System remix), Chrome Optimism (Ming vs. Subatomic Sound System remix), & Chrome Optimism (April White vs. Subatomic Sound System remix)
Chrome Optimism Dubblestandart meets Lee "Scratch" Perry and David Lynch (2010, Subatomic Sound | cat# SS012 | 12" vinyl, 33rpm) included remixes Chrome Optimism (Subatomic Sound System remix) & Deadly Funny (Subatomic Sound System dub)
Luv 'n Liv Dub Gabriel w/U-Roy (2010, Destroy All Concepts | cat# DAC009 | digital) included remixes Luv 'n Liv (Ming vs. Subatomic Sound System remix)
Dubstep EP  Dubblestandart (2009, Collision/Select Cuts/ Echo Beach| | digital) included remixes: "Iron Devil (Subatomic Sound System remix)" "Blackboard Jungle (Subatomic Sound System remix)"
Return From Planet Dub  Dubblestandart, Lee "Scratch" Perry and Ari Up (2009, Collision/Select Cuts/ Echo Beach| CCT3019-2 | Double CD, digital) included remixes: "Blackboard Jungle (Subatomic Sound System remix)" Extensive liner notes by writer David Katz
Remixed  Eyesight Project (2008, Modus Vivendi Music | MVM007 | digital) included remixes: "On Chrome (Subatomic Sound System remix)"

Compilations
 SUBcontinentalBASS (2011, High Chai | digital) included song "NYC-2-India" a new version on NYC-2-Africa riddim with vocals by Delhi Sultanate. Hit No. 1 on Beatport reggae chart.The Sound of Rhythm & Culture (2010, Rhythm & Culture | CD, digital) included songs: "Dub Steppa" by Thomas Blondet & Subatomic Sound SystemBKLYN: Heavy Sound from the County of Kings (2009, Bastard Jazz Recordings | CD, digital) included songs: "Our Father, Our King"Nickodemus & Mariano present Turntables on the Hudson 10 Year Anniversary (2009, Wonderwheel | Double CD, digital) included songs: "Our Father, Our King"Northern Faction 4 (2009, Balanced Records | CD, digital) included songs: "Walking On The Moon" a dub version of the Police song based on the music from "Our Father, Our King"Modus Vivendi Music Vol. 2 (2008, Modus Vivendi Music | MVM008 | CD, digital) included songs: "Ghetto Champion", "Our Father, Our King (Golden remix)"MixesCode Orange Relaxation Techniques  Subatomic Sound System (2002, Subatomic Sound | CD)

Unreleased and forthcoming works"Revolution" Ari Up and The Slits (cover version of the famous Dennis Brown song)| Subatomic Sound System dub mix | (2008, unreleased)"21st Century Life" Sam Sparro | Island Records | Subatomic Sound System dub mix for U.S. single release | (2009, unreleased)"Black and Gold (song)" Sam Sparro | Island Records |Subatomic Sound System remix of 2009 Grammy nominated song for U.S. single release | (2008, unreleased)

Television and film
 Californication (TV series) | 2012: Season 5 ep 111 | Showtime | features the song "The Chronicles" by Subatomic Sound System
 CSI:Miami | By The Book episode aired Oct. 30, 2011 | CBS | The Halloween episode features the remix of "Vampires & Informers" by Elephant Man on Subatomic Sound label.
 Vans Triple Crown of Surfing | North Shore Underground - Hank Gaskell | Fuel TV & Vans Triple Crown Surfing website | "Ghetto Champion" and several Subatomic Sound System songs this and other 2010 highlight segments
 Dog The Bounty Hunter | The Big Wipeout | A&E Network | Subatomic Sound System song "Ghetto Champion" was the featured song on this episode
 Dog The Bounty Hunter | Smackdown of Baby Lyssa | A&E Network | Subatomic Sound System song "Criminal" was the featured song on this episode
 Dog The Bounty Hunter | Crime Don't Pay'' | A&E Network | Subatomic Sound System song "Doin' It" was the featured song on this episode

References

External links
 Label and group site

American hip hop groups
Electronic music groups from New York (state)
Record production teams
American reggae musical groups
Musical groups established in 1999
1999 establishments in New York (state)